Mohammad Ali Mohammadi Acha-Cheloi (born 30 March 1951 in Mianeh) is an Iranian former cyclist. He competed in the individual road race event at the 1976 Summer Olympics. He also participated at the 1982 Asian Games and won a bronze medal in team time trial event.

References

External links
 

1951 births
Living people
Iranian male cyclists
Olympic cyclists of Iran
Cyclists at the 1976 Summer Olympics
People from Mianeh
Asian Games bronze medalists for Iran
Asian Games medalists in cycling
Cyclists at the 1982 Asian Games
Medalists at the 1982 Asian Games
20th-century Iranian people